Ljubav živi (English: Love Lives) is the fourteenth studio album by Serbian pop-folk singer Ceca. It was released on 17 June 2011, exactly five years after the release of her previous album.

Track listing
Rasulo
Hajde
Šteta za mene
Igračka samoće
Ona
Nije mi dobro
Hvata me
Sve što imam i nemam
Ljubav živi

Personnel
Music, produced & arrangement by: Aleksandar Milić-Mili 
Author: Ljiljana Jorgovanović, Marina Tucaković
Female back-vocals - Ivana Peters (all songs)
Sound design - Ivan Milosavljević-Milke
Pre-mix - Ivan Milosavljević-Milke
Mix - Siniša Kokerić, Ivan Milosavljević-Milke (in "PRINC" studio in 2011)
Mastering - James Cruz (New York)
Design - OMAR

Release history

References

2011 albums
Ceca (singer) albums